Mihaela Mitrache (aka Mihaela Mitraki; July 8, 1955, Bucharest -  February 18, 2008, Balotești) was a Romanian movie and theatre actress. She graduated from Bucharest Movie and Theatre Institute in 1978, where she was a student in actor Marin Moraru's class.

Activity

Theatre

Movie

Television
Don Juan or the Love of Geometry by Max Friesh, directed by Eugen Todoran

Nominations and awards
National award for best female act: Honey - Who's afraid of Virginia Woolf at Studio Theatres Festival, Oradea 
Nomination for best female act, Jerusalem Movie Festival: Milky way, 1997

External links
Cronica Română
Mediafax
Cinemagia
Nine o'clock
Stiri ROL
Romanians online
Ediţia specială
Anima news
I had a colleague...

1955 births
2008 deaths
Actresses from Bucharest
Romanian stage actresses
Romanian television actresses
Romanian film actresses